USS Leyte (ARG-8), later USS Maui (ARG-8), was a Luzon-class internal combustion engine repair ship that saw service in the United States Navy during World War II. Named after Leyte Island in the Philippines, she was the second U.S. Naval vessel to bear the name Leyte.

Construction 
Leyte was laid down on 20 January 1944 at the Bethlehem-Fairfield Shipyard, Inc. in Baltimore, Maryland; launched on 18 February 1944; sponsored by Miss Rhoda J. Braun; and commissioned on 17 August 1944.

Operations 
After training in Chesapeake Bay, Leyte sailed from Norfolk, Virginia, on 3 October 1944 for Pacific duty.  She reported to Commander Service Force 7th Fleet on 26 November at Hollandia, New Guinea.  Here she became a repair ship for LSMs, and continued this service until she departed for the Philippine Islands on 25 February 1945.

For the remainder of the War, Leyte served in Subic Bay.  Her name was changed to USS Maui (ARG-8) on 31 May (after the Island of Maui, making her the second U.S. Naval vessel to bear that name) so that the name Leyte could be assigned to a new aircraft carrier then under construction, designated . The ship departed Subic Bay in early December and arrived on the west coast with 1,108 returning war veterans before Christmas. She became inactive in March, 1946 and decommissioned at San Diego, California on 30 August where she was assigned to the San Diego Group of the Pacific Reserve Fleet.

Transfer and scrapping 
In June, 1961 Maui was transferred to the National Defense Reserve Fleet at Suisun Bay in Benicia, California. The ship was struck from the Naval Vessel Register in September 1962, at which time custody was transferred to MARAD. Reacquired by the Navy briefly in February–April 1967, after which Maui was again struck from the Naval Register and returned to MARAD, where she remained until 1972 at which time she was scrapped.

References

 
 
 
Photo gallery at Naval Historical Center

 

Luzon-class repair ships
Ships built in Sparrows Point, Maryland
1944 ships
World War II auxiliary ships of the United States